Emmanouil Zymvrakakis may refer to:

 Emmanouil Zymvrakakis (Cretan revolutionary) (died 1821)
 Emmanouil Zymvrakakis (Gendarmerie general) (1856–1931), nephew of the above
 Emmanouil Zymvrakakis (army general) (1861–1928), grandson of E. Zymvrakakis (died 1821)